Solanum sturtianum, commonly known as Thargomindah nightshade, is a flowering plant in the family Solanaceae. It is an upright shrub with grey-green leaves and purple flowers. This species is endemic to Australia.

Description
The branches have scattered, numerous or a scarce covering of prickles. Flowering may occur throughout the year and the fruit is a berry  in diameter, surface brittle and yellowish to brown-black.

Taxonomy and naming
Solanum sturtianum was first formally described in 1854 by Ferdinand von Mueller and the description was published in Transactions of the Philosophical Society of Victoria. The specific epithet (sturtianum) honours Charles Napier Sturt.

Distribution and habitat
Thargomindah nightshade grows in arid areas of New South Wales, Queensland, South Australia, Western Australia and the Northern Territory.

References

External links

sturtianum
Plants described in 1854
Flora of New South Wales
Flora of Queensland
Flora of South Australia
Eudicots of Western Australia
Flora of the Northern Territory